Eriostepta fulvescens is a moth of the family Erebidae first described by Walter Rothschild in 1909. It is found in French Guiana, Suriname, the upper Amazon region, Brazil and Bolivia.

References

Phaegopterina
Moths described in 1909